Wilmot Gibbes de Saussure (July 23, 1822  – February 1, 1886) was a brigadier general in the South Carolina militia, who served along with the Confederate States Army in South Carolina at various times during the American Civil War. As a colonel, he led his regiment in the occupation of Fort Moultrie and the bombardment of Fort Sumter at the beginning of the war. He was appointed brigadier general as well as adjutant general and inspector general of South Carolina militia in 1862. He commanded part of the Charleston defenses during the Union siege of the city in 1863. He also led his men in opposition to Major General William T. Sherman's march through the Carolinas.

De Saussure served five two-year terms in the South Carolina General Assembly in 1848–1849, 1854–1857 and 1860–1863. He also served as South Carolina Secretary of the Treasury from the summer of 1861 to April 11, 1862.  After the war, de Saussure was a prominent lawyer and was active in civic affairs. He wrote several works of South Carolina history and was a grand master of Freemasons and president of the Huguenot Society, the Cincinnati Society and other civic organizations.

Early life
Wilmot G. de Saussure was born in Charleston, South Carolina, on July 23, 1822. His parents were Henry A. de Saussure, a lawyer, and Susan (Boone) de Saussure. De Saussure graduated from the University of South Carolina in 1840 after two years of study. He then studied law and became a prominent lawyer at Charleston in practice with his father.

De Saussure served in the South Carolina House of Representatives of the South Carolina General Assembly in 1848–1849, 1854–1857 and 1860–1863.

Wilmot Gibbes de Saussure married Martha Gourdin. When their eldest son, Henry A. de Sassure, died in 1903, two adult sons and three adult daughters survived their brother.

American Civil War service
Wilmot Gibbes de Saussure began his Civil War service as a colonel in the 1st South Carolina Artillery Regiment of the 4th Brigade of the South Carolina militia at the siege of Fort Sumter. His force occupied Fort Moultrie when the U.S. Army garrison withdrew to Fort Sumter on December 26, 1861. De Saussure was in command of the Morris Island batteries during the bombardment of Fort Sumter on April 12 through April 14, 1861.

In August 1861, de Saussure was appointed a brigadier general in the South Carolina militia and was given command of the 4th Brigade for the remainder of the war. On April 11, 1862, de Saussure was elected adjutant general and inspector general of the South Carolina militia. He also was appointed Secretary of the Treasury of South Carolina in the summer of 1861 by South Carolina Governor Francis Pickens.

De Saussure commanded a force of militia and Confederate States Army troops during the siege of Charleston in 1863. This force guarded the rear of the city.

In late 1864 and early 1865, de Saussure's men were sent to oppose the forces of Union Major General William T. Sherman as they marched through the Carolinas.

Later life
After the war, Wilmot G. de Saussure was a prominent lawyer and was active in civic affairs in Charleston. He wrote several works of South Carolina history. He was president of the Huguenot Society and the Cincinnati Society (Sons of Cincinnati). He was also president of the St. Andrew's Society, the St. Cecilia Society and the Charleston Library Society. He was a Harbor Commissioner for Charleston and a member of the Chamber of Commerce. De Saussure was a Freemason. He served as a grand master of his lodge from 1873 to 1875. He also was a member of the Odd Fellows. Brother de Saussure served as Grand Sire during the term 1853–1855 – being installed in Philadelphia, Pennsylvania, and presiding in Baltimore, Maryland.

Wilmot Gibbes de Saussure died on February 1, 1886, in Ocala, Florida, where he had gone with the hope of restoring his deteriorated health. He is buried in Magnolia Cemetery, Charleston, South Carolina.

See also

List of American Civil War generals (Acting Confederate)

Notes

References
 Alderman, Edwin Anderson, Joel Chandler Harris and Charles William Kent. 'Library of Southern Literature: Biographical dictionary of authors', Volume 15. Atlanta: The Martin & Hoyt Company, 1907. . Retrieved January 30, 2013.
 Allardice, Bruce S. More Generals in Gray. Baton Rouge: Louisiana State University Press, 1995. .
 Butler, Nicholas Michael. 'Votaries of Apollo: The St. Cecilia Society and the Patronage of Concert Music in Charleston, South Carolina, 1766 - 1820'. Columbia, SC: University of South Carolina Press, 2007. . Retrieved January 30, 2013.
 Chesnut, Mary Boykin Miller and Comer Vann Woodward. 'Mary Chesnut's Civil War'. New Haven: Yale University Press, 1981. . Retrieved January 30, 2013.
 Cowles, John H. 'Supreme Council 33rd Degree Part 1 Or Mother Council of the World of the Ancient and Accepted Scottish Rite of Freemasonry, Southern Jurisdiction, United States of America'  Washington, D.C.: Scottish rite Supreme Council for the Southern jurisdiction, 1931. Reprint: Whitefish, Mont.: Kessinger Publishing, LLC, 2003. . Retrieved September 11, 2012.
 Denslow, William R. and Harry S Truman.  '10,000 famous freemasons 1 From A to J'. Originally published in 1957.  Whitefish, Mont.: Kessinger, 2004. . Retrieved September 11, 2012.
 Eicher, John H., and David J. Eicher. Civil War High Commands. Stanford, CA: Stanford University Press, 2001. .
 Herringshaw, Thomas William. 'Herringshaw's national library of American biography: contains thirty-five thousand biographies of the acknowledged leaders of life and thought of the United States', Volume 2. Chicago: American Publishers, 1909. . Retrieved January 30, 2013.
 Huguenot Society of London.  'Proceedings of the Huguenot Society of London', Volume 4, 1891–1893. London: Chas. T. King, 1894. . Retrieved January 30, 2013.
 Johnson, Michael P. and James L. Roark. 'No Chariot Let Down: Charleston's Free People of Color on the Eve of the Civil War'. Chapel Hill, NC: University of North Carolina Press, 1984. . Retrieved January 30, 2013. 
 Johnson, Rossiter and John Howard Brown, eds. 'The Twentieth Century Biographical Dictionary of Notable Americans', Volume 3. Boston: The Biographical Society, 1904. .  Retrieved January 30, 2013.
 La Borde, Maximilian. 'History of the South Carolina College, From Its Incorporation, Dec. 19, 1801, to Nov. 25, 1857'. Columbia, SC: Peter B. Glass, 1859, . reprint Carlisle, MA: Applewood Books. . Retrieved January 30, 2013.
 Pettigrew, James Johnston and Dan Bauer. 'The long lost journal of Confederate General James Johnston Pettigrew'. San Jose : Writers Club Press, 2001. . Retrieved January 30, 2013. 
 Salley Jr.,  A. S., ed. South Carolina Historical Society.  'The South Carolina historical magazine, Volumes 5-6'. Volume V. Charleston: The Walker, Evans and Cogswell Company, 1904. . Retrieved September 11, 2012.

External links
 
 'Wilmot G. DeSaussure Order-Book, 1860-1861'. The Southern Historical Collection of archival material held in the Wilson Library at the University of North Carolina at Chapel Hill. Retrieved January 31, 2013.

1822 births
1886 deaths
Confederate militia generals
People of South Carolina in the American Civil War
Members of the South Carolina House of Representatives
Politicians from Charleston, South Carolina
19th-century American politicians
Lawyers from Charleston, South Carolina
Wilmot Gibbes
19th-century American lawyers